Mersad Selimbegović (born 29 April 1982) is a Bosnian professional football coach and former player who is the manager of 2. Bundesliga club Jahn Regensburg.

Managerial statistics

References

External links

1982 births
Living people
People from Rogatica
Bosnia and Herzegovina footballers
Association football defenders
NK Žepče players
FK Željezničar Sarajevo players
3. Liga players
SSV Jahn Regensburg players
2. Bundesliga managers
SSV Jahn Regensburg managers
SSV Jahn Regensburg non-playing staff
Bosnia and Herzegovina expatriate footballers
Bosnia and Herzegovina expatriate football managers
Bosnia and Herzegovina expatriate sportspeople in Germany
Expatriate footballers in Germany
Expatriate football managers in Germany